Michael Joseph "Kid" Madden (October 22, 1866 – March 16, 1896) was an American Major League Baseball player who pitched for three different teams from  to . He played for the Boston Braves, Boston Reds, and Baltimore Orioles. Madden died of "consumption" (tuberculosis) at the age of 29 in his hometown of Portland, Maine, leaving behind a widow and two children. He is interred at South Portland's Calvary Cemetery.

References

External links 

1866 births
1896 deaths
Major League Baseball pitchers
Baseball players from Maine
Boston Reds (AA) players
Boston Reds (PL) players
Boston Beaneaters players
Baltimore Orioles (AA) players
19th-century baseball players
Portland (minor league baseball) players
Indianapolis Hoosiers (minor league) players
Providence Clamdiggers (baseball) players
Erie Blackbirds players
Haverhill (minor league baseball) players
Sportspeople from Portland, Maine
People from South Portland, Maine
Burials in Maine
19th-century deaths from tuberculosis
Tuberculosis deaths in Maine